The Mayuni Conservancy is a conservation area in Linyanti Constituency, in Namibia's northeastern Caprivi Region, along the eastern bank of the Cuando River.

Facilities
Nambwa Campsite is in the Mayuni conservation area and started its operations in the year 2004. Nambwa is in the Kongola area in the Caprivi region. The campsite is located on the west of Katima Mulilo along the Katima Mulilo Highway, on the peripherals of the Bwabwata National Park.

References

Geography of Namibia
Tourism in Namibia
Zambezi Region
Nature conservation in Namibia